André Lawrence Hidi (born June 5, 1960) is a Canadian former ice hockey player.  Hidi played seven games with the Washington Capitals.

Biography
Hidi was born in Toronto, Ontario. As a youth, he played in the 1973 Quebec International Pee-Wee Hockey Tournament with a minor ice hockey team from Toronto. Hidi played junior hockey with the Peterborough Petes to 1981, then went to the University of Toronto. He was drafted by the Colorado Rockies in 1980. He was signed as a free agent in March 1984 by the Washington Capitals. He would play seven games in the NHL and 121 in the American Hockey League with the Binghamton Whalers. During his seven total career games with the Capitals, Hidi scored 2 goals and 1 assist while receiving 9 penalty minutes.

In 2014, Hidi was inducted into the University of Toronto Hall of Fame.

, Hidi is the Head of Mergers and Acquisitions at BMO Capital Markets.

Career statistics

References

External links

Profile at hockeysdraftcentral.com

1960 births
Living people
Binghamton Whalers players
Canadian ice hockey forwards
Colorado Rockies (NHL) draft picks
Peterborough Petes (ice hockey) players
Ice hockey people from Toronto
Toronto Varsity Blues ice hockey players
Washington Capitals players